The Iloilo Provincial Capitol is the seat of the provincial government of Iloilo in the Philippines.

History 
The new Iloilo Provincial Capitol was built in 2006 after a 1998 fire of unknown source damaged the Casa Real de Iloilo, the old capitol, damaging almost half of the whole building, leaving only the main building. The old capitol has been renovated and restored to its former glory and is now being used as a lobby and reception area for visiting guests and dignitaries.

The new capitol is considered one of the most modern and largest capitol buildings in the Philippines.

Architecture 
The Iloilo Provincial Capitol was designed by Filipino architect Guillermo Hisancha. The capitol complex underwent redevelopment in 2019, including the building of a 6-storey with roof deck multilevel parking building; landscaping of the front of the Capitol building up to the Casa Real, or the Old Provincial Capitol; improvement of the grounds adjacent to the Western Visayas Regional Museum; and the improvement of the power station. The centerpiece of the redevelopment project is the mural titled "Panaysayun sang Paranublion." The two-meter by 15-meter mural, which depicts the rich culture and heritage of the province, was designed by architects Victor Jacinto, Ryan Angelo Braga, Kenneth Torre, and Jorge Cadiao Jr. It was sculpted by architects Margarette and Albert Pampliega.

See also 

 Casa Real de Iloilo

References 

Buildings and structures completed in 2006
Provincial capitols in the Philippines
Buildings and structures in Iloilo City
21st-century architecture in the Philippines